Captain Richard Haddock (1673–1751) was a Royal Navy officer who became Comptroller of the Navy.

Naval career
Born the son of Admiral Sir Richard Haddock, Haddock Junior was given command of HMS Resolution in 1708. He became Comptroller of the Navy in 1734. He inherited from his father a house at Mile End and a property in Soham in Cambridgeshire.

References

1673 births
1751 deaths
Royal Navy officers